WROJ-LP is a Contemporary Christian formatted low-power broadcast radio station licensed to Saint Cloud, Minnesota, serving Saint Cloud and Sauk Rapids in Minnesota.
The station signed on the air in late July 2015, from a tower shared with KNSI and KCML on St. Cloud's southeast side.

References

External links
 
 

2015 establishments in Minnesota
Contemporary Christian radio stations in the United States
Radio stations established in 2015
Stearns County, Minnesota
Low-power FM radio stations in Minnesota
Radio stations in St. Cloud, Minnesota
Christian radio stations in Minnesota